Maria at La Granja is a painting by Joaquín Sorolla. It is part of the collection of the San Diego Museum of Art.

External links
 

Paintings by Joaquín Sorolla
Paintings in the collection of the San Diego Museum of Art